3-Hydroxyasparagine also known as β-hydroxyasparagine (beta-hydroxyasparagine) is a modified asparagine amino acid. It appears in posttranslational modification of cbEGF-like domains which can occur in humans and other Eukaryotes. The amino acid code used for this is Hyn. The modified amino acid residue is found in fibrillin-1. This amino acid is also found in urine.

References

Amino acid derivatives
Beta hydroxy acids